Landi Khana railway station was a railway station near the Pakistani town of Torkham, on the Pakistan-Afghanistan border. It was established on 23 April 1926 during British rule. The railway connecting the station to nearby Landi Kotal was closed on 15 December 1932, at the request of the Afghan government.

See also
 List of railway stations in Pakistan
 Pakistan Railways

Notes

Further reading

 Christensen, J. (1926), The New Afghanistan, The Muslim World, 16: 349–356. .
 H. E. Crocker, The khyber pass, Journal of the Royal Central Asian Society.  Vol. 18, Iss. 3, 1931. .

External links

Railway stations in Khyber District
Railway stations on Khyber Pass line
1926 establishments in India